Hamilton Avenue is a station on the River Line light rail system, located on Hamilton Avenue in Trenton, New Jersey.
The station opened on March 15, 2004. Southbound service from the station is available to Camden, New Jersey. Northbound service is available to the Trenton Rail Station with connections to New Jersey Transit trains to New York City, SEPTA trains to Philadelphia, Pennsylvania, and Amtrak trains. Transfer to the PATCO Speedline is available at the Walter Rand Transportation Center.
 
This station was not in the River Line's original plans, but was added when the public demanded a stop to serve the CURE Insurance Arena which opened in 1999 on the opposite side of Route 129.

Transfers 
New Jersey Transit buses: 409, 601, 603, 609, and 613

References

External links

 Station from Google Maps Street View

River Line stations
Buildings and structures in Trenton, New Jersey
Railway stations in Mercer County, New Jersey
Railway stations in the United States opened in 2004
2004 establishments in New Jersey